

List

References

T